Pedro Votta (born 7 July 1937) is a Uruguayan boxer. He competed in the men's light middleweight event at the 1960 Summer Olympics.

References

1937 births
Living people
Uruguayan male boxers
Olympic boxers of Uruguay
Boxers at the 1960 Summer Olympics
Sportspeople from Montevideo
Light-middleweight boxers